Valwood School is an independent, coeducational, college preparatory segregation academy located  outside of Valdosta, Georgia, United States. It offers programs from pre-kindergarten through high school. There were 511 students enrolled in the 2015–2016 school year.

History
Valwood School was founded as a segregation academy by local white people in response to the federally mandated racial desegregation of public schools. Valwood's first classes were inaugurated in September 1969, in the old Central Elementary School building in Valdosta. Classes were offered to white students for grades 1-10, with kindergarten and eleventh grade programs being added in 1970. The first full graduation exercise was held in June, 1972, and the school moved to Gornto Road in the fall of that year. A preschool program was added in 1982. Various improvements to the physical plant were completed over the years, including a gymnasium/cafeteria complex in 1973 and an athletic field in 1989. The school opened its new campus at the location, two miles (3 km) north of Valdosta on Old US Hwy 41, on August 26, 2002.

Accreditation and memberships
 The National Association of Independent Schools
 The Southern Association of Independent Schools
 The National Association for College Admission Counseling
 The Southern Association for College Admission Counseling
 The Georgia Independent School Association
 Quality by the Georgia Accrediting Commission Member

Libraries 

The students and faculty at Valwood are served by two libraries. The Corker Giles Library, which is located in the Crane Hall administration building serves the school's Middle and Upper School students in a variety of capacities: as a library, a classroom, a meeting space, and a computer lab. College recruiters and guest speakers use the Corker Giles library when visiting the school, and guest authors use Skype to share their books with the students. Corker Giles library underwent a massive reconfiguration under the guidance of Dr. Darren Pascavage, who had a vision of a Learning Commons for the school.

The Turner Library, located in Foy Anderson Hall, serves the school's Lower School population, which encompasses Pre-K through Fifth grade. Library curriculum includes GALILEO research, Keyboarding, Google apps as well as themed based literature units. The Lower School students participate in the Georgia Book Award program each year, as well as an activity filled Read Across America Week each March. Turner Library is also used as a meeting space for groups such as Odyssey of the Mind, as well as individual tutoring.

Athletics

Valwood is a member of the Georgia Independent School Association (GISA) and currently competes in region 3-AAA.

The Valiants football team were the GISA Class A Champions in 1985, 1986, 1999, GISA Class AA Champions in 2012, and GISA Class AAA Champions in 2015 and 2017.  The men's tennis team has won four GISA titles: 1992, 2000, 2001, and 2002. The women's tennis team has won four GISA titles: 2001, 2002, 2003, and 2014.

References

External links
 Valwood School official website

Private high schools in Georgia (U.S. state)
Educational institutions established in 1969
Schools in Lowndes County, Georgia
Private middle schools in Georgia (U.S. state)
Private elementary schools in Georgia (U.S. state)
Preparatory schools in Georgia (U.S. state)
1969 establishments in Georgia (U.S. state)
Segregation academies in Georgia